Lee Eun-jeong (이은정) or Ri Un-jong (리은정) may refer to:
Lee Eun-jeong (born 1965), South Korean police officer
Lee Eun-jeong (tennis) (born 1976), South Korean tennis player
Lee Eun-jung (born 1981), South Korean long-distance runner
Yi Eun-jung (born 1988), South Korean golfer